This article presents a list of the historical events and publications of Australian literature during 1919.

Books 

 Randolph Bedford — Aladdin and the Boss Cockie
 Erle Cox — Out of the Silence
 Edward Dyson — The Escapades of Ann
 Mary Gaunt — A Wind from the Wilderness
 Jack McLaren
 Red Mountain
 The Skipper of the Roaring Meg
 The White Witch
 Harrison Owen — The Mount Marunga Mystery
 Arthur J. Rees — The Shrieking Pit
 Steele Rudd — We Kaytons
 Ethel Turner — Brigid and the Cub

Poetry 

 E. J. Brady — House of the Winds
 John Le Gay Brereton — The Burning Marl
 C. J. Dennis — Jim of the Hills
 Edward Dyson — Hello, Soldier!: Khaki Verse
 Will Dyson — "Death is but Death"
 John Shaw Neilson — Heart of Spring
 Vance Palmer 
 "The Dandenongs"
 "Homecoming"
 A. B. Paterson — "Boots"

Short stories 

 Basil Garstang — "Robson"
 Sumner Locke — "The Tyranny of Love"
 Dowell O'Reilly — "Twilight"

Births 

A list, ordered by date of birth (and, if the date is either unspecified or repeated, ordered alphabetically by surname) of births in 1919 of Australian literary figures, authors of written works or literature-related individuals follows, including year of death.

 6 January — Geoffrey C. Bingham, theological and short story writer (died 2009)
 9 May — Nene Gare, novelist (died 1994)
 28 May — Olga Masters, novelist (died 1986)
17 December — Charlotte Jay, suspense novelist (died 1996)

Deaths 

A list, ordered by date of death (and, if the date is either unspecified or repeated, ordered alphabetically by surname) of deaths in 1919 of Australian literary figures, authors of written works or literature-related individuals follows, including year of birth.

 17 January — E. S. Emerson, poet (born 1870)
 12 March — Ruby Lindsay, artist and writer (born 1885)
 10 September — J. F. Archibald, editor (born 1856)

See also 
 1919 in poetry
 List of years in literature
 List of years in Australian literature
 1919 in literature
 1918 in Australian literature
 1919 in Australia
 1920 in Australian literature

References

Literature
Australian literature by year
20th-century Australian literature